Jamil Awad (28 April 1937 – 28 October 2021) was a Jordanian actor, writer and director.

Biography 
Awad was born to a Jordanian father and a Lebanese mother. He studied interior design and started working for Jordan TV since its opening in 1968. He participated in many national, historical and social television series. He was married to actress Juliet Awwad.

Death
Awad died of kidney failure on 28 October 2021.

Partial filmography 

 Al-Qarar As-Sa’ab (2017)
 Al-Dam'a Al-Hamra'a (2016)
 Hanaya Al-Ghaith (2015)
 Thahab wa Awda (2015)
 Ru'ood Al-Mazn (2014)
 The Last Cavalier (2013)
 Abwab Al-Ghaim (2009)
 Al-Taghreba al-Falastenya (2004)
 Al-Bahth Ann Saladin (2001)
 Al-Manseyyah (2000)
 Qamar wa Sahar (1998)

References 

Living people
Jordanian male film actors
Jordanian male actors
Jordanian male television actors
1937 births